Denis Ronald Lewin (21 June 1920 – 24 September 1985) was an English professional football defender. His clubs included Fulham and Gillingham, where he made 191 Football League appearances.
He would coach the Norway national football team and Cheltenham Town before coaching Everton, Newcastle United, Knattspyrnufélagið Þróttur and also in the Netherlands, Egypt and Kuwait.

References

1920 births
1985 deaths
Footballers from Edmonton, London
English footballers
English football managers
Bradford City A.F.C. players
Stockport County F.C. players
Fulham F.C. players
Gillingham F.C. players
Norway national football team managers
Cheltenham Town F.C. managers
Walsall F.C. managers
Newcastle United F.C. non-playing staff
English expatriate sportspeople in Norway
Expatriate football managers in Norway
Knattspyrnufélag Reykjavíkur managers
Chatham Town F.C. players
Association football defenders
Chelmsford City F.C. non-playing staff
Everton F.C. non-playing staff
Association football coaches